Eastern Air Lines Flight 66 was a regularly scheduled flight from New Orleans to New York City that crashed on June 24, 1975 while on approach to New York's John F. Kennedy International Airport, killing 113 of the 124 people on board. The crash was determined to be caused by wind shear caused by a microburst, but the failure of the airport and the flight crew to recognize the severe weather hazard was also a contributing factor.

Flight information

Eastern Air Lines Flight 66 was a regularly scheduled passenger flight from New Orleans, Louisiana's New Orleans International Airport (renamed in 2001 to Louis Armstrong New Orleans International Airport) to John F. Kennedy International Airport in Jamaica, Queens, New York. On Tuesday June 24, 1975, Flight 66 was operated using a Boeing 727 trijet, registration number N8845E.

The flight departed from Moisant Field at 13:19 Eastern Daylight Time with 124 people on board, including 116 passengers and 8 crew. The flight operated from New Orleans to the New York City area without any reported difficulty.

The flight crew consisted of the following:

 The captain was 54-year-old John W. Kleven, who had been serving with Eastern Air Lines for nearly 25 years, and had been a 727 captain since July 10, 1968. Kleven had a total of 17,381 flight hours, including 2,813 hours on the Boeing 727.
 The first officer was 34-year-old William Eberhart, who had been with Eastern Air Lines for nearly nine years. He had 5,063 flight hours, with 4,327 of them on the Boeing 727.
 The flight engineer was 31-year-old Gary M. Geurin, who had been with Eastern Air Lines since 1968 and had 3,910 flight hours, 3,123 of them on the Boeing 727.
 The second flight engineer, 33-year-old Peter J. McCullough, had been with Eastern Air Lines for four years and had 3,602 military flying hours and 1,767 civil flying hours, including 676 hours on the Boeing 727. He was administering a required flight check on Geurin.

Crash
A severe thunderstorm arrived at JFK just as Flight 66 was approaching the New York City area. At 15:35, the aircraft was told to contact the JFK approach controller for instructions, and the approach controller sequenced it into the approach pattern for Runway 22L. At 15:52, the approach controller warned all incoming aircraft that the airport was experiencing "very light rain showers and haze" and zero visibility, and that all approaching aircraft would need to land using instrument flight rules.

At 15:53, Flight 66 was switched to another frequency for final approach to Runway 22L. Controllers continued giving the crew radar vectors to operate around the approaching thunderstorms and sequence into the landing pattern with other traffic. Because of the deteriorating weather, one of the crew members checked the weather at LaGuardia Airport in Flushing, Queens, the flight's alternate airport. At 15:59, the controller warned all aircraft of "a severe wind shift" on final approach, and advised that more information would be reported shortly. Although communications on the frequency continued to report deteriorating weather, Flight 66 continued on its approach to Runway 22L. At 16:02, the crew was told to contact the JFK tower controller for landing clearance.

At 16:05, on final approach to Runway 22L, the aircraft entered a microburst or wind shear environment caused by the severe storms. After the initial impact, the plane banked to the left and continued to strike the approach lights until it burst into flames and scattered the wreckage along Rockaway Boulevard, which runs along the northeast perimeter of the airport. Of the 124 people on board, 107 passengers and six crew members (including all four flight crew members) were killed. The other 11 people on board, including nine passengers and two flight attendants, were injured but survived.

At the time, the crash was the deadliest in United States history, and would remain so until the 1978 Pacific Southwest Airlines Flight 182 crash. The victims included American Basketball Association player Wendell Ladner, a member of the 1974 champion, New York Nets, and Iveson B. Noland, bishop of the Episcopal Diocese of Louisiana.

Investigation and results
The accident was investigated by the National Transportation Safety Board (NTSB).  As the investigation progressed, it was found that 10 minutes before Flight 66's crash, a Flying Tiger Line Douglas DC-8 cargo jet landing on Runway 22L reported tremendous wind shear on the ground. The pilot warned the tower of the wind shear conditions, but other aircraft continued to land. After the DC-8, an Eastern Air Lines Lockheed L-1011 landing on the same runway nearly crashed. Two more aircraft landed before Flight 66. According to the conversation recorded by the cockpit voice recorder, the captain of Flight 66 was aware of reports of severe wind shear on the final approach path (which he confirmed by radio to the final-vector controller), but decided to continue nonetheless.

The NTSB published its final report on March 12, 1976, determining the following probable cause of the accident:

The National Transportation Safety Board determines that the probable cause of this accident was the aircraft's encounter with adverse winds associated with a very strong thunderstorm located astride the ILS localizer course, which resulted in high descent rate into the non-frangible approach light towers. The flight crew's delayed recognition and correction of the high descent rate were probably associated with their reliance upon visual cues rather than on flight instrument reference. However, the adverse winds might have been too severe for a successful approach and landing even had they relied upon and responded rapidly to the indications of the flight instruments.

The NTSB also concluded that failure of either air traffic controllers or the flight crew to abort the landing, given the severe weather conditions, also contributed to the crash:

Contributing to the accident was the continued use of runway 22L when it should have become evident to both air traffic control personnel and the flight crew that a severe weather hazard existed along the approach path.

Legacy

This accident led to the development of the original low level wind shear alert system by the U.S. Federal Aviation Administration in 1976, which was installed at 110 FAA towered airports between 1977 and 1987. The accident also led to the discovery of downbursts, a weather phenomenon that creates vertical wind shear and poses dangers to landing aircraft, which ultimately sparked decades of research into downburst and microburst phenomena and their effects on aircraft.

The concept of downbursts was not yet understood when Flight 66 crashed. During the investigation, meteorologist Ted Fujita worked with the NTSB and the Eastern Air Lines flight-safety department to study the weather phenomena encountered by Flight 66. Fujita identified "cells of intense downdrafts" during the storm that caused aircraft flying through them "considerable difficulties in landing". Fujita named this phenomenon "downburst cells" and determined that a plane can be "seriously affected" by "a downburst of air current". Fujita proposed new methods of detecting and identifying downbursts, including installation of additional weather monitoring equipment at the approach ends of active runways, and also proposed development of new procedures for immediately communicating downburst detection to incoming aircraft.

Fujita's downburst theory was not immediately accepted by the aviation meteorology community. However, the crashes of Pan Am Flight 759 in 1982 and Delta Air Lines Flight 191 in 1985 prompted the aviation community to re-evaluate and ultimately accept Fujita's theory and to begin researching downburst/microburst detection and avoidance systems in earnest.

See also 

Aviation safety
List of accidents and incidents involving commercial aircraft
1956 Kano Airport BOAC Argonaut crash
Delta Air Lines Flight 191
USAir Flight 1016
Aeromexico Connect Flight 2431
Pan Am Flight 759
Martinair Flight 495
United Nations Flight 834
1950 Air France multiple Douglas DC-4 accidents

Footnotes

References

Airliner accidents and incidents caused by microbursts
1975 in New York City
1975 meteorology
66
Aviation accidents and incidents in the United States in 1975
Accidents and incidents involving the Boeing 727
Airliner accidents and incidents in New York City
1970s in Queens
June 1975 events in the United States
John F. Kennedy International Airport